Mladen Kujundžić (born August 3, 1989) is Croatian kickboxer and mixed marial artist fighting out of Opatija, Croatia. 

In April 2017, he was ranked the #10 light-heavyweight in the world by LiverKick.com. In June and July 2016, he was ranked the #9 heavyweight in the world by Combat Press.

Kickboxing career

Early career
Kujundžić had his first professional fight against Denis Marjanović, on September 25, 2010. He won the fight by unanimous decision. The two of them fought a rematch two months later, with Marjanović winning a unanimous decision. During the Bilić Erić Security Fight Night 5 event, Kujundžić fought Ivica Ivić. He won the fight by a second-round knockout, stopping Ivić with a low kick. He would go on to win his next three fights against Tom Van Duivenvoorde, Ivica Soldo and Jasmin Bečirović, before taking part in the Fight Code: Rhinos Series tournament. Kujundžić beat Anatoloy Nosyrev by TKO in the first fight, but lost to Freddy Kemayo in the quarterfinals.

After this tournament loss, Kujundžić was scheduled to fight Rok Štrucl at WFC 15. The fight went into an extra round, after which Štrucl won by decision. Bouncing back from the first losing streak of his career, Kujundžić won his next three fights. He won his first fight against Marin Došen by decision, and beat Srđan Seleš and Nermin Terzić by TKO. At the 8. Kickboxing Memorijal David Šain event, Kujundžić was scheduled to fight Igor Mihaljević. Igor Mihaljević won the fight by unanimous decision.

Final Fight Championship
In 2013, Kujundžić signed with Final Fight Championship. He made his organizational debut during FFC03, in a rematch with Rok Štrucl. He won the rematch by unanimous decision. At FFC06, Kujundžić fought Nikola Dimkovski, winning the fight by unanimous decision. He won his next two fight against Alija Tucak and Sanid Imamović by DQ and TKO respectively, extending his winning streak to four.

He made his Glory debut at Glory 14: Zagreb, when he was scheduled to fight Elmir Mehić. He won the fight by TKO, after the ringside doctor stopped the fight at the end of the second round. At FFC12, Kujundžić knocked out Dženan Poturak with middle kick in the first round. His winning streak was stopped by Alexandr Bodruchin at FFC15, who knocked him out in the first round.

K-1 and Tatneft cup
Kujundžić rebounded from this loss by winning his next two fights against Janos Koszfan and Andre Langen by decision. At WFL Laktaši, Kujundžić fought Fabio Kwasi for the first time. Kwasi won the fight by a second-round TKO.

Kujundžić once again rebounded from a loss by winning his next two fights, winning a decision against Vasil Ducar and knocking out Frank Muñoz. He next fought Maxim Bolotov in the 2016 Tatneft Cup selection tournament. Bolotov won the fight by an extra round decision.

At Respect World Series 1, Kujundžić achieved the highest profile win of his career up to that point, managing to knock out the former SUPERKOMBAT Super Cruiserweight champion Andrei Stoica.

Kujundžić took part in the 2016 K-1 Belgrade Heavyweight tournament, being scheduled to fight Fabio Kwasi. Kwasi once again won the fight by unanimous decision. Kujundžić further participated in the 2017 Tatneft Cup selection tournament. He knocked out Rustam Azimov in the first round of the tournament, but lost to Petr Romankevich in the second round by decision.

FEA
After a year long layoff, Kujundžić returned to fight Françesco Xhaja at Legends Collide. He lost by unanimous decision.

In 2019, Kujundžić signed with FEA. In his first fight with the organization, he fought Alexandru Burduja. The fight went into an extra round, after which he won a split decision. He won his next fight against Joao Chapas Silva by decision, as well.

He was scheduled to fight Mikhail Tyuterev in the semifinals of the 2020 FEA Heavyweight GP, but the fight never materialized.

Kujundžić challenged Alexandru Burduja for the FEA Light Heavyweight (-93 kg) championship at FEA Full Drive on December 17, 2022. He captured the title by split decision.

Awards, records, and honors
Combat Press  
2016 Fight of the Year nomination (vs. Andrei Stoica)
Fighting Entertainment Association
2022 FEA Light Heavyweight (-93 kg) Championship

Professional kickboxing record

|- 
|-  style="text-align:centr; background:#cfc;"
| 2022-12-27  || Win ||align=left| Alexandru Burduja  || FEA Full Drive || Ciorescu, Moldova || Decision (Split) || 5 || 3:00 
|-
! style=background:white colspan=9 |
|-
|-  style="text-align:centr; background:#fbb;"
| 2022-05-22 || Loss ||align=left| Younes Benmalek || Alpha Fight League|| Bruxelles, Belgium || Decision || 3 || 3:00 
|-
|-  style="text-align:centr; background:#cfc;"
| 2019-08-24 || Win ||align=left| Joao Chapas Silva  || FEA World GP Odessa|| Odessa, Ukraine || Decision (Unanimous) || 3 || 3:00 
|- 
|-  style="text-align:centr; background:#cfc;"
| 2019-03-30 || Win ||align=left| Alexandru Burduja || FEN|| Chișinău, Moldova || Ext. R. Decision (Split) || 4 || 3:00 
|- 
|-  style="text-align:centr; background:#fbb;"
| 2018-11-17 || Loss ||align=left| Françesco Xhaja || Legends Collide|| Slovenia || Decision (Unanimous)|| 3 || 3:00 
|-
|-  style="text-align:centr; background:#fbb;"
| 2017-07-20 || Loss ||align=left| Petr Romankevich || Tatneft Cup 2017 - 1st selection 1/4 final|| Kazan, Russia || Decision (Unanimous)|| 4 || 3:00
|-
|-  style="text-align:centr; background:#cfc;"
| 2017-05-31 || Win ||align=left| Rustam Azimov || Tatneft Cup 2017 - 3rd selection 1/8 final|| Kazan, Russia || KO (Low kicks) || 2 || 2:10 
|-
|-  style="text-align:centr; background:#fbb;"
| 2016-10-27 || Loss ||align=left| Fabio Kwasi  || K-1 World GP 2016 -95kg Championship Tournament || Belgrade, Serbia || Decision (Unanimous)||3 ||3:00
|-
|-  style="text-align:centr; background:#cfc;"
| 2016-03-19 || Win ||align=left| Andrei Stoica || Respect World Series 1 || Madrid, Spain || KO (Left Hook) || 1 || 
|-
|-  style="text-align:centr; background:#fbb;"
| 2016-02-12 || Loss ||align=left| Maxim Bolotov || Tatneft Cup 2016 - 1st Selection 1/8 Final || Kazan, Russia || Decision || 4 || 3:00 
|- 
|-  style="text-align:centr; background:#cfc;"
| 2015-11-27 || Win ||align=left| Frank Muñoz || FFC21: Rijeka  || Rijeka, Croatia || KO (Right High Kick)  ||  2 || 2:43
|-
|-  style="text-align:centr; background:#cfc;"
| 2015-10-31 || Win ||align=left| Vasil Ducar || Opatija Fight Night 6 || Opatija, Croatia || Ext. R. Decision  || 4 || 3:00
|-
|-  style="text-align:centr; background:#fbb;"
| 2015-09-25 || Loss ||align=left| Fabio Kwasi || WFL Laktaši || Laktaši, BIH || TKO (Ref. Stoppage) || 2 || 
|-
|-  style="text-align:centr; background:#cfc;"
| 2015-09-04 || Win ||align=left| Andre Langen || Tatneft Cup 2015 Final || Kazan, Russia || Decision || 4 || 3:00  
|- 
|-  style="text-align:centr; background:#cfc;"
| 2015-04-08 || Win ||align=left| Janos Koszfan || Oluja u ringu 7 || Knin, Croatia || Decision (Unanimous)||3 ||3:00 
|-
|-  style="text-align:centr; background:#fbb;"
| 2014-11-21 || Loss ||align=left| Alexandr Bodruchin || FFC15: Poreč || Poreč, Croatia || KO (Straight Right) || 1 || 
|-
|-  style="text-align:centr; background:#cfc;"
| 2014-04-25 || Win ||align=left| Dženan Poturak ||  FFC12: Fabjan vs. Daley || Ljubljana, Slovenia || KO (Left Middle Kick) || 1 || 
|-
|-  style="text-align:centr; background:#cfc;"
| 2014-03-08 || Win ||align=left| Elmir Mehić || Glory 14: Zagreb ||Zagreb, Croatia || TKO (Doctor stoppage) || 2 ||  3:00
|-
|-  style="text-align:centr; background:#cfc;"
| 2013-10-25 || Win ||align=left| Sanid Imamović || FFC08: Zelg vs. Rodriguez || Zagreb, Croatia || TKO || 1 ||  1:19
|-
|-  style="text-align:centr; background:#cfc;"
| 2013-09-13 || Win ||align=left| Alija Tucak || Fight For Glory || Banja Luka, BiH || DQ (Headbut) || 3 ||  
|-
|-  style="text-align:centr; background:#cfc;"
| 2013-06-14 ||Win ||align=left| Nikola Dimkovski || FFC06: Jurković vs. Poturak || Poreč, Croatia || Decision (Unanimous)||3 ||3:00 
|-
|-  style="text-align:centr; background:#cfc;"
| 2013-04-18 ||Win ||align=left| Rok Štrucl || FFC03: Jurković vs. Cătinaș || Split, Croatia || Decision (Unanimous)||3 ||3:00  
|-
|-  style="text-align:centr; background:#fbb;"
| 2013-04-07 || Loss ||align=left| Igor Mihaljević ||  8. Kickboxing Memorijal David Šain || Poreč, Croatia || Decision (Unanimous) || 3 ||3:00
|-  style="text-align:centr; background:#cfc;"
| 2012-10-27 || Win ||align=left| Nermin Terzić || Bajić Team & Ameno Fight Night Split || Split, Croatia || TKO (Low kick) || 1 || 0:05
|-  style="text-align:centr; background:#cfc;"
| 2012-07-21 || Win ||align=left| Srđan Seleš || Mega Fight || Umag, Croatia || TKO (Referee stoppage) || 3 || 
|-  style="text-align:centr; background:#cfc;"
| 2012-03-10 || Win ||align=left| Marin Došen || Cro Cop Final Fight || Zagreb, Croatia || Ext.R.Decision (Unanimous) || 4 || 3:00
|-  style="text-align:centr; background:#fbb;"
| 2011-12-18 || Loss ||align=left| Rok Štrucl|| WFC 15 - Olimp Sport Nutrition || Ljubljana, Slovenia 
|| Ex.R.Decision || 4 || 3:00
|-  style="text-align:centr; background:#fbb;"
| 2011-10-22 || Loss ||align=left| Freddy Kemayo || Fight Code: Rhinos Series, Quarter Finals || Moscow, Russia || Decision (unanimous) || 3 || 3:00
|-  style="text-align:centr; background:#cfc;"
| 2011-07-09 || Win ||align=left| Anatoloy Nosyrev || Fight Code: Rhinos Series, Final 16 (Part 2) || Istanbul, Turkey || TKO (Injury) ||  ||
|-  style="text-align:centr; background:#cfc;"
| 2011-04-09 || Win ||align=left| Jasmin Bečirović || Slovenian muay thai league || Brežice, Slovenia || Decision || 3 || 3:00
|-  style="text-align:centr; background:#cfc;"
| 2011-02-20 || Win ||align=left| Ivica Soldo || Opatija Fight Night 3 || Opatija, Croatia ||  ||  ||
|-  style="text-align:centr; background:#cfc;"
| 2010-12-10 || Win ||align=left| Tom Van Duivenvoorde || Podgorica Fight Night || Podgorica, Montenegro || KO  || 2 || 
|-  style="text-align:centr; background:#cfc;"
| 2010-11-28 || Win ||align=left| Ivica Ivić || Bilić Erić Security Fight Night 5 || Zagreb, Croatia || KO (Low Kick) || 2 || 
|-  style="text-align:centr; background:#fbb;"
| 2010-11-06 || Loss ||align=left| Denis Marjanović || Banja Luka Fight Night 2 || Banja Luka, BIH || Decision (Unanimous) || 3 || 3:00
|-  style="text-align:centr; background:#cfc;"
| 2010-09-25 || Win ||align=left| Denis Marjanović || Fight Night  || Viškovo, Croatia || Decision (Unanimous) || 3 || 2:00
|-
|-
| colspan=9 | Legend:

Mixed martial arts record

|-
|Loss
|align=center| 4–6–1
| Vlado Neferanović
| Submission (Rear-naked choke)
| FNC 7
| 
|align=center|1
|align=center|1:08
|Pula, Croatia
|
|-
|Loss
|align=center| 4–5–1
| Lukasz Sudolski
| KO (Punches)
| Babilon MMA 18
| 
|align=center|1
|align=center|0:13
|Lodž, Poland
|
|-
|-
|Loss
|align=center| 4–4–1
| Gerald Turek
| Submission (Rear-Naked Choke)
| WFC 16 - Return of the Champions
| 
|align=center|2
|align=center|
|Ljubljana, Slovenia
|
|-
|Loss
|align=center| 4–3–1
| Denis Stojnić
| Submission (Rear-Naked Choke)
| United Glory - 2010-2011 World Series Finals
| 
|align=center|1
|align=center|4:59
|Moscow, Russia
|
|-
|Loss
|align=center| 4–2–1
| Matteo Minonzio
| Submission (Guillotine Choke)
| SLAM FC 3
| 
|align=center|1
|align=center|
|Firenze, Italia
|
|-
|Win
|align=center| 4–1–1
| Mihajlo Fincur
| TKO (Knees)
| TBCB - K-1 and FreeFight Night
| 
|align=center|1
|align=center|
|Brežice, Slovenia
|
|-
|Win
|align=center| 3–1–1
| Alen Dolicanin
| Submission (Rear-Naked Choke)
| MedVid - Ultimate Fight Labin
| 
|align=center|1
|align=center|
|Labin, Croatia
|
|-
|Loss
|align=center| 2–1–1
| Pero Ogrizek
| Submission (Punches)
| OFN - Opatija Fight Night 2
| 
|align=center|2
|align=center|3:36
|Opatija, Croatia
|
|-
|Win
|align=center| 2–0–1
| Krisztian Gera
| TKO (Punches)
| SFD - Summer Fight Day
| 
|align=center|1
|align=center|
|Opatija, Croatia
|
|-
|Win
|align=center| 1–0-1
| Sead Mujagić
| TKO 
| 
| 
|align=center|
|align=center|
|Vienna, Austria
|
|-
|Draw
|align=center| 0–0-1
| Mario Valentić
| Draw
| OFN - Opatija Fight Night 1
| 
|align=center|
|align=center|
|Opatija, Croatia
|MMA debut.

References

Croatian male kickboxers
Croatian male mixed martial artists
Heavyweight kickboxers
1989 births
Living people
People from Opatija